The 1949 San Francisco State Gators football team represented San Francisco State College—now known as San Francisco State University—as a member of the Far Western Conference (FWC) during the 1949 college football season. Led by Dick Boyle in his seventh and final season as head coach, San Francisco State compiled an overall record of 3–4–1 with a mark of 1–2–1 in conference play, tying for third place in the FWC. For the season the team was outscored by its opponents 218 to 114. The Gators played home games at Cox Stadium in San Francisco.

Schedule

References

San Francisco State
San Francisco State Gators football seasons
San Francisco State Gators football